In England, regional ministers were appointed from 2007 on a part-time basis as part of Her Majesty's Government. Each minister had other departmental responsibilities, as well as specific responsibilities for one of the English regions. Their stated role was "to provide a clear sense of strategic direction for the nine English regions and to help strengthen their links with central government."

Following the 2010 general election, the Prime Minister's Spokesman was asked on 17 May 2010 if Regional Ministers had been scrapped. He said that the process of completing appointments to the Government was continuing, and that the Prime Minister, David Cameron, "had been very clear on the importance of devolution".  On 4 June 2010 the Evening Standard reported that the post of Minister for London had been scrapped. No formal announcements were made in relation to regional ministers, but as of October 2010 no appointments had been made by the coalition government.

Since 2010, a number of similar roles have been created, including a Minister for Cities in 2011, Minister for Portsmouth in 2014 and Minister for the Northern Powerhouse in May 2015.

Background
Regional ministers in England were first appointed by the incoming Prime Minister, Gordon Brown, on 28 June 2007, as part of his initial Government reshuffle. At the time, his spokesman said that their role would be "to act as regional champions within government, and to represent the government in parliamentary debates and other forums on regional issues."

A proposal to establish such ministerial positions had been made by think tank the New Local Government Network (NLGN) in its report Redesigning Regionalism: Leadership and Accountability in England's Regions, which in turn had developed from a 2006 pamphlet written by MPs Ed Balls and John Healey, and NLGN Director and former MP Chris Leslie.  Establishing regional ministerial posts was proposed by the NLGN "if devolution from Whitehall to regional and local leadership is regarded as too big a step straight away". The report argued that "...the appointment of a series of Ministerial portfolio holders to represent and act for Government as policy leaders in each of the English regional might provide a greater degree of focus for regional policy, encourage a more integrated approach across Whitehall, and offer superior opportunities for scrutiny and cross-examination of regional decisions in Parliament."  It followed from the 2004 rejection by voters in the North East of England of a proposed elected regional assembly.

In London, the post of Minister for London had first been established by the then Conservative government in 1994.

Responsibilities
The Governance of Britain Green Paper, published in July 2007, provided the following objectives for regional ministers:
 to advise the Secretary of State for the Department for Business, Innovation and Skills (BIS) on the approval of regional strategies and appointment of Regional Development Agency (RDA) chairs and boards;
 to represent regional interests in the formulation of central government policy relevant to economic growth and sustainable development in areas that have not been devolved to the RDAs
 to facilitate a joined up approach across government departments and agencies to enable the effective delivery of the single regional strategy
 to champion the region at high level events and with regard to high-profile projects (including through a programme of regional visits); and
 to represent the Government with regard to central government policy at regional committee hearings and at parliamentary debates focused specifically on the region.

It also stated:
There are a range of functions that Regional Ministers will undertake. These are mostly clustered around the responsibilities of the Government Offices and the Regional Development Agencies, particularly in relation to economic development. Regional Ministers will be able to take questions in Parliament on the work of regional bodies, and on regional strategies. Regional ministers will be a visible representative of their area – they will take a key role in bringing together local services and different arms of government at important times for the region, whether in bidding for or hosting major sporting occasions (e.g. the Commonwealth Games); or when a region faces difficult challenges (e.g. the severe flooding afflicting Yorkshire and the Humber, and the East and West Midlands in June 2007).

Opposition
The establishment of the regional minister posts was opposed by the Conservative opposition.  In a 2009 debate on the setting up of regional Select Committees of Parliament, to which the regional ministers report, the Shadow Leader of the House, Alan Duncan, said:The document The Governance of Britain says that regional Ministers, who are supposedly to be held to account by these Select Committees, do all sorts of important things. It sets out their responsibilities, stating that they "represent", "facilitate", "champion" and again "represent" various things in the document. But do they decide anything? No, they do not. These Ministers are fictitious Ministers, supposedly joining up the various tentacles of government and somehow making a Minister in one Department tie his or her decisions in with those of a Minister in another Department. The people who should be held to account, if that is necessary, are the Ministers who take those decisions, not these supposed facilitators who have no executive responsibility whatever. They are faux Ministers – false Ministers – and they do not really exist as Ministers at all.

Ministerial appointments 2007-2010

London

South East

South West

West Midlands

North West

North East

Yorkshire and the Humber

East Midlands

East

Developments since 2010 
In July 2011, Greg Clark was appointed to the new role of Minister for Cities, which from July 2014 was combined with Minister for Universities and Science. The role has presumably been unfilled upon Clark's promotion to Secretary of State for Communities and Local Government in May 2015.

In January 2014, the post of Minister for Portsmouth was created, with the aim to help support the city's shipbuilding industry. The role was initially held by Michael Fallon until the appointment of Matthew Hancock in July 2014, who was replaced by Mark Francois in May 2015.

In April 2014, Labour leader Ed Miliband proposed the reintroduction of regional ministers, corresponding to the nine English regions, who would sit on a new regional committee based at the Cabinet Office.

In May 2015, James Wharton was appointed to the new role of Minister for the Northern Powerhouse, focusing on wider devolution to English "core cities" including Manchester, Leeds, Sheffield, Liverpool, and Newcastle.

See also
 Government Offices for the English Regions
 Regional development agency
 :Category:Regional Select Committees of the British House of Commons

Notes

References

Defunct ministerial offices in the United Kingdom
Politics of England
Regional planning in England
Regional ministries